The Pennsylvania Stoners were an American soccer team based in Allentown, Pennsylvania. Founded in 2007, the team played in the National Premier Soccer League (NPSL), a national amateur league at the fourth tier of the American Soccer Pyramid, in the Eastern Keystone Division.

The team played its home games at the Zephyr Sports Complex on the campus of Whitehall High School in nearby Whitehall Township, Pennsylvania, where they had played since 2009. The team's colors were royal blue and white.

The Stoners name was derived from Pennsylvania's official nickname, The Keystone State. A previous incarnation of the Stoners was a member of the American Soccer League from 1979 to 1983.

History
The original Stoners were members of the American Soccer League from 1979 to 1983, during which time the team registered a win-loss-tie record of 76-49-25. The Stoners won the league championship in 1980.  Due to increasing competition from other soccer leagues, and decreasing attendance, the team, along with the rest of the league, folded in 1983.

The team was resurrected in 2007 as the Pennsylvania Stoners, and competed in the National Premier Soccer League (NPSL). The team originally played its home games at J. Birney Crum Stadium in Allentown. 

In 2008, the team captured the NPSL league championship. In 2009, the Stoners began playing their home matches at Whitehall-Coplay School District's Zephyr Sports Complex in nearby Whitehall.  The team folded after the 2009 season.  In 2010, the FC Sonic Lehigh Valley brought NPSL soccer back to the Lehigh Valley.

Players

Current roster
as at June 7, 2009

Individual honors
Coach of the Year - Willie Ehrlich (1979, 1980)
MVP - George Gorleku (1980)
Goalkeeper of the Year: Scott Manning (1980)
Goalkeeper of the Year: Tom Reynolds (1981)
All-Star Team: Ken McDonald (1981)
All-Star Team: Jeff Tipping (1981)

Year-by-year

Honors
 NPSL Champions 2008
 NPSL North Division Champions 2008
 ASL Champions 1980
 ASL National Division Champions 1980

Head coaches
  Willie Ehrlich (1979–80)
  Gary Hindley (1982–83)
  Todd Ervin (2008)
  David Weitzman (2009)

Stadiums
J. Birney Crum Stadium in Allentown, Pennsylvania (2008)
Zephyr Sports Complex at Whitehall High School in Whitehall Township, Pennsylvania (2009)

References

External links

2007 establishments in Pennsylvania
2009 disestablishments in Pennsylvania
Amateur soccer teams in Pennsylvania
American Soccer League (1933–1983) teams
Association football clubs established in 2007
Association football clubs disestablished in 2009
National Premier Soccer League teams
Soccer clubs in Pennsylvania
Sports in Allentown, Pennsylvania